Gordon W. Burrows (April 28, 1926 – January 10, 1997) was an American politician who served in the New York State Assembly from 1966 to 1988.

He died of cardiac arrest on January 10, 1997, in Manhattan, New York City, New York at age 70.

References

1926 births
1997 deaths
Republican Party members of the New York State Assembly
20th-century American politicians